Strange Universe is the third studio album by Canadian rock band Mahogany Rush, led by Frank Marino. It was released in 1975.

Track listing
All songs by Frank Marino.

 "Tales of the Spanish Warrior" - 4:57
 "The King Who Stole (...the Universe)" - 3:57
 "Satisfy Your Soul" - 3:17
 "Land of 1000 Nights" - 4:44
 "Moonlight Lady" - 4:08
 "Dancing Lady" - 3:11
 "Once Again" - 3:34
 "Tryin' Anyway" - 3:45
 "Dear Music" - 4:19
 "Strange Universe" - 6:58

Personnel
Frank Marino – guitars, keyboards, vocals
Paul Harwood – acoustic and electric bass
Jimmy Ayoub – drums, percussion

Charts

References

1975 albums
20th Century Fox Records albums
Mahogany Rush albums